Ruth Ellen Goodman (born 5 October 1963) is a British freelance historian of the early modern period, specialising in offering advice to museums and heritage attractions. She is a specialist in British social history and after presenting the 2005 television series Tales from the Green Valley, went on to participate in several BBC historic farm series. She occasionally presents features for The One Show, and she co-presented Secrets of the Castle in 2014, and 24 Hours in the Past (2015).

Early life
She was born in Cardiff and went to Westbury primary school and Fearnhill School in Letchworth. "School...was rather pedestrian...I became a very poor student, simply going through the motions, and my academic record at both school and university indeed lacks lustre."

Career 
Goodman "couldn't get a job after university", so she trained for a job as railway ticket clerk,  for British Rail, working at Chester railway station, got pregnant, and only lasted a year because she could not go back to work, part-time, after giving birth.

Goodman has been a consultant to the Victoria & Albert Museum and the film Shakespeare in Love. She is a member of the Tudor Group, a re-enactment organisation for the Tudor period. As a result of her social history research, she has stopped using detergents in her washing machine, never eats factory farmed food and sometimes cooks on an open wood fire.

Since participating in Tales of the Green Valley in 2005, she has been a presenter on the BBC television educational documentary series Victorian Farm, Victorian Pharmacy, Edwardian Farm, Tudor Monastery Farm, Wartime Farm, Wartime Farm Christmas, Secrets of the Castle, and Full Steam Ahead. Goodman participated in the 2011 series of Celebrity Masterchef. Since 2015, Goodman has presented segments within the BBC television series Inside the Factory.

In 2007, the Weald and Downland Living Museum Historic Clothing Project was founded by Hannah Tiplady, Head of Interpretation, consulted by Goodman and historical costumier Barbara Painter.

In 2022, Goodman was featured in A Farm Through Time with brothers Rob and Dave Nicholson, a three-part series shown on Channel 5 that explores how farming practices have changed over the years. Prior to A Farm Through Time she had appeared with the brothers on one of their nightly ...on the Farm programmes at Cannon Hall Farm, discussing alcoholic brews from the past.

Personal life 
She lives in Buckinghamshire and is married to Tudor reenactor and musician Mark Goodman (who participated in one episode of Tudor Monastery Farm). Their two daughters, Eve and Catherine have made appearances with their mother on television.

Goodman was awarded an honorary degree in 2012 by Bishop Grosseteste University College, Lincoln, for her contribution to history education.

Goodman, for a period of three months, followed a Tudor body cleansing regime, no one complained or noticed a smell.

Publications
 How to be a Tudor: A Dawn-to-Dusk Guide to Everyday Life (2016). 
 How to be a Victorian (2014). 
 How to Behave Badly in Elizabethan England: A Guide for Knaves, Fools, Harlots, Cuckolds, Drunkards, Liars, Thieves, and Braggarts (2018). 
 How to Behave Badly in Renaissance Britain (2018). 
 The Domestic Revolution: How the Introduction of Coal into Victorian Homes Changed Everything (2020).

References

External links
 
 
 BBC History Magazine podcast, August 2008 (MP3)

1963 births
British historians
British women historians
British television presenters
Living people
People associated with Bishop Grosseteste University
People educated at Fearnhill School
People from Aylesbury Vale
People from Letchworth
Social historians
British women television presenters